The National Coalition for Romania (CNR) is a grand coalition in Romania, which includes the Social Democratic Party (PSD), the National Liberal Party (PNL), and the Democratic Alliance of Hungarians in Romania (UDMR/RMDSZ). In addition, this grand coalition supports the incumbent Romanian President Klaus Iohannis as well, who, on his turn, praised the coalition for its activity in early 2022, stating that "the Romanian political class has shown democratic maturity".

History 

After the political crisis in autumn 2021, PNL, PSD, and the UDMR/RMDSZ reached an agreement to rule the country together through a solid grand coalition for the next 7 years. Thus, it has been agreed that the prime minister and several other important ministries should be changed every 1 year and a half. Consequently, the first prime minister to be appointed was national liberal Nicolae Ciucă. His cabinet was sworn in on 25 November.

On 23 November, Marcel Ciolacu (PSD) was elected president of the Chamber of Deputies. Also the same day, Anca Dragu (USR) was dismissed as Senate chairman, being replaced by the former Prime Minister Florin Cîțu (PNL).

The coalition, up until the swearing in of Ciucă's cabinet, was initially referred to as the Coalition for Resilience, Development and Prosperity (CRDP).

Criticism 

While former PSD and PNL rivals claim to have made the alliance in the interest of the people, there was heavy criticism of both parties because they promised not to form an alliance with each other. President Klaus Iohannis, who is rumored to be the coalition's architect, was sharply criticized, because between 2018–2020 he had repeatedly criticized the PSD, then brought the PSD back to government. At one point, PNL president Florin Cîțu claimed that "Our [PNL's] former [coalition] partners [the USR] shook hands with the PSD, [and] they didn't want to shake hands with us [the PNL] anymore".

Critics also called the coalition USL 2.0, as well as kleptocratic, authoritarian, illiberal and corrupt.

Electoral history
It is still unknown whether or not the coalition would also participate together in the upcoming elections.

Legislative elections 

 Notes
1 

2

See also 

 Social Liberal Union (USL): a similar alliance active between 2011 and 2014
 Force of the Right (FD): the most recent PNL splinter founded by former PNL president and former Prime Minister Ludovic Orban

References

2021 establishments in Romania
National Liberal Party (Romania)
Political parties established in 2021
Political party alliances in Romania
Social Democratic Party (Romania)